South Cape Halt  (Manx: Stadd Rheynn Yiass)  is an intermediate stopping place on the easterly section of the Manx Electric Railway on the Isle of Man.

Location
The halt is located on the outskirts of Laxey and it serves the area of the village known as Old Laxey and lies above the beach.  It acts as a useful drop-off point for visitors wishing to access the beach rather than the village itself.

Facilities
The station is notable for its substantial corrugated iron shelter with perimeter seating and a sign is displayed outside advising passengers to alight here for the beach, and keep their seats for the village, the Snaefell Mountain Railway and Ramsey.

Route

Also
Manx Electric Railway Stations

References

Sources

 Manx Electric Railway Stopping Places (2002) Manx Electric Railway Society
 Island Images: Manx Electric Railway Pages (2003) Jon Wornham
 Official Tourist Department Page (2009) Isle Of Man Heritage Railways

Railway stations in the Isle of Man
Manx Electric Railway
Railway stations opened in 1894